José Justo Milla Pineda (1794 in Gracias – 1838) was a Honduran military leader who was the governor of the state of Honduras within the Federal Republic of Central America from 10 May 1827 to 13 September 1827. He was a member of the Liberal Party of Honduras. He fled his office in 1827 after losing to Francisco Morazán in the Battle of La Trinidad. Justo Milla spent the remainder of his life in Mexico, where he died, never living to see the dissolution of the Central American Republic and the independence of Honduras.

References 

1794 births
1838 deaths
People from Lempira Department
Honduran military personnel
Liberal Party of Honduras politicians
19th-century Honduran people
Governors of Honduras
Federal Republic of Central America